Cooper's Hill is an  biological Site of Special Scientific Interest in Ampthill in Bedfordshire. It was notified under Section 28  of the Wildlife and Countryside Act 1981 in 1984, and the planning authority is Central Bedfordshire Council. A smaller area of 12.7 hectares is also a Local Nature Reserve, Part of the site is managed by the Wildlife Trust for Bedfordshire, Cambridgeshire and Northamptonshire.

The site is described by Natural England as the best surviving example in Bedfordshire of heathland on the thin acidic soils of the Lower Greensand Ridge. It also has areas of marsh and woodland.

There is access from Alameda Road and Station Road.

References

External links 
 Wildlife Trust of Bedfordshire, Cambridgeshire and Northamptonshire website

Local Nature Reserves in Bedfordshire
Sites of Special Scientific Interest in Bedfordshire
Wildlife Trust for Bedfordshire, Cambridgeshire and Northamptonshire reserves